Epimelitta euphrosyne is a species of beetle in the family Cerambycidae. It was described by Newman in 1840.

References

Epimelitta
Beetles described in 1840